Ivan Hryhorovych Kyrylenko (born 2 October 1956 in Berestove (Zaporizhzhia Oblast), Ukrainian SSR) is a Ukrainian politician and from 2007 till December 2011 faction leader of Yulia Tymoshenko Bloc in the Ukrainian Parliament.

Education
In 1978 he graduated from the Dnepropetrovsk Agricultural Institute, specializing in agricultural scientist. In 1991, Kirilenko was a graduate of the Academy of Social Sciences in Moscow, the specialty analyst.

Doctor of Economics, Ph.D. in History. He defended his thesis entitled "Social development of village: Experience, Problems, Prospects (for example Prydniprovia USSR)" in 1991 at the Academy of Social Sciences (Moscow), and in 1997 ibid - doctoral thesis "The formation and development of the agricultural economy in the form of a market transformation."

Labor and political activity 

Before becoming a politician Kyrylenko worked as head of a collective farm (kolkhoz) and as a civil servant in the Ministry of Agriculture of the Dnipropetrovsk Oblast.

He was first elected into Parliament on an independent candidate on in December 1995 he then joined the faction Unity. At the 1998 Ukrainian parliamentary election Kyrylenko was elected into Parliament on a Hromada ticket. When Yulia Tymoshenko set up the breakaway All-Ukrainian Union "Fatherland" faction Kyrylenko joined her.

Kyrylenko left Parliament 2001 to become Minister of Agriculture (in the Kinakh Government) and one of the founding members of (the now defunct electoral bloc) For United Ukraine in 2001. At the time of the next elections he was a member of the Agrarian Party (a part of For United Ukraine). Kyrylenko was Deputy Prime Minister in the First Yanukovych Government (2002-January 2005) cabinet of Viktor Yanukovych.

In 2006 and 2007 he was elected into Parliament on an All-Ukrainian Union "Fatherland" ticket.  According to Yulia Tymoshenko, Kyrylenko is her “godfather in politics”. After the 2007 election he was elected faction leader of Yulia Tymoshenko Bloc in the Ukrainian Parliament. The faction re-elected as its faction leader Andriy Kozhemiakin.

Kyrylenko was placed at number 15 on the electoral list of Batkivshchina during the 2012 Ukrainian parliamentary election; he was re-elected into parliament. He served on the Committee of the Verkhovna Rada on issues of European integration.

In the 2014 Ukrainian parliamentary election he was again re-elected into parliament; this time after placing 14th on the electoral list of Batkivshchina.

Scientific activity 

Published more than 100 scientific works, including some 10 books, including five in collaboration and 2 monographs.

Trained Doctors 2 and 3 candidates.

Elected in 2002, a corresponding member of Academy of Agrarian Sciences Research Office of Transfer of innovation.

Personal life
The politician is married and his wife Zinaida name. Together they have a daughter.

Awards
 Order of the Badge of Honour (1986)
 Honored Worker of Agriculture of Ukraine (1993)
 Order of Merit II class (2004).

References

1956 births
Living people
People from Zaporizhzhia Oblast
Vice Prime Ministers of Ukraine
Hromada (political party) politicians
Second convocation members of the Verkhovna Rada
Third convocation members of the Verkhovna Rada
Fourth convocation members of the Verkhovna Rada
Fifth convocation members of the Verkhovna Rada
Sixth convocation members of the Verkhovna Rada
Seventh convocation members of the Verkhovna Rada
Eighth convocation members of the Verkhovna Rada
Ninth convocation members of the Verkhovna Rada
Recipients of the Order of Merit (Ukraine), 2nd class
All-Ukrainian Union "Fatherland" politicians
People's Party (Ukraine) politicians
Agriculture ministers of Ukraine